Sir Francis Fenwick Pearson, 1st Baronet,  (13 June 1911 – 17 February 1991) was a British colonial administrator, farmer and politician.

Colonial service
Pearson attended Uppingham School in Rutland, and then Trinity Hall, Cambridge. He was commissioned a Second Lieutenant onto the Unattached List for the Indian Army from being a Second Lieutenant, T.A. (University Candidate) in September 1932, with seniority from 29 January 1931. After a year attached to a British regiment in India, he was appointed to the Indian Army and posted to the 1st King George's Own Gurkha Rifles as of 3 November 1933. He served as Aide-de-camp to the Viceroy of India from June 1935 to April 1936.

He transferred to the Indian Political Service in October 1935. In June 1945 he was appointed a Member of the Order of the British Empire as captain, Indian Political Service. He finished as Chief Minister of Manipur State from 1945 to 1947, and the village of Pearson in the Churachandpur district was named in his honour.

With the independence of India imminent, Pearson returned to Britain and settled in Lancashire where he became a farmer, and also involved himself in local government. He was a Justice of the Peace for Lancashire from 1952.

Parliamentary career
At the 1959 general election, Pearson replaced Richard Fort (who had died earlier in the year) as Conservative Party Member of Parliament for Clitheroe, a rural constituency in the Lancashire foothills of the Pennines. He was swiftly named as an Assistant Government Whip (1960) and became a Lord Commissioner of the Treasury (Government Whip) in March 1962.

Parliamentary Private Secretary
Sir Alec Douglas-Home, who became Prime Minister in October 1963, choose Pearson to be his Parliamentary Private Secretary, an unpaid but pivotal role where Pearson had to maintain relations between the Prime Minister and his own backbenchers. When Douglas-Home lost the 1964 general election and resigned as Prime Minister, he gave Pearson a Baronetcy in his resignation honours list.

Lancashire contribution
Pearson retired from Parliament at the 1970 general election, but not from politics. He was Chairman of the Central Lancashire New Town Development Corporation from 1971 (the new town covered Preston, Chorley, Leyland and several other areas).

References

M. Stenton and S. Lees, "Who's Who of British MPs" (Harvester Press, 1981)

External links 

1911 births
1991 deaths
Alumni of Trinity Hall, Cambridge
Baronets in the Baronetage of the United Kingdom
British Indian Army officers
Conservative Party (UK) MPs for English constituencies
Deputy Lieutenants of Lancashire
English justices of the peace
Indian Political Service officers
Manipur politicians
Members of the Order of the British Empire
Ministers in the Macmillan and Douglas-Home governments, 1957–1964
Parliamentary Private Secretaries to the Prime Minister
UK MPs 1959–1964
UK MPs 1964–1966
UK MPs 1966–1970